Play Hard is the first EP from Chicago-area electronic dance music band Krewella. It was self-released on June 18, 2012, with tour dates spanning the third quarter of that year. The work also topped Beatport.  Group member Yasmine states that the name was created by "this concept of working hard and playing harder because no matter what we are doing whether it be partying or making music we always go hard".

Track listing

Charts

EP

Singles

References 

2012 debut EPs
Krewella EPs